Hatz is a surname. Notable people with the surname include:

 Beatriz Hatz (born 2000), American Paralympic athlete
 Christopher Hatz (born 1991), German racing cyclist
 Georges Hatz (1917–2007), French football player and manager
 Michael Hatz (born 1970), Austrian footballer

See also
 Hatz, German engine manufacturer founded by Mathias Hatz